Legend of Anle (Chinese: 安乐传), also known as An Le Zhuan, is an upcoming Chinese historical streaming television series co-produced by Youku, and Shanghai Films & Media Corporation and directed by Cheng Zhi Chao, Ma Hua Gan, and Su Fei. It was adapted from  the novel "The Emperor's Book" (帝皇书) by Xing Ling and stars Dilraba Dilmurat and Gong Jun. The series is set to premiere on Youku with 40 episodes.

Synopsis 
This is a sad and touching love story between Di Zi Yuan (played by Dilraba Dilmurat) and Crown Prince Han Ye (played by Gong Jun). Ten years ago, her family was wiped out, and Di Zi Yuan was the sole survivor. For the peace of the nation and to uncover the truth of how had the current imperial family ascended to the throne, she enters the imperial court under the name of Ren Anle. Di Zi Yuan becomes acquainted with Crown Prince Han Ye. The two of them began to investigate a case of foreign aggression against the nation. Though love starts to blossom between the two, the enmity between their families over the Di family massacre puts a tension on the relationship between.

Cast 
Dilraba Dilmurat as Ren Anle / Di Ziyuan
Gong Jun as Han Ye
Liu Yuning as Luo Mingxi
Xia Nan as Princess Anning
Tim Pei as Mo Bei
Chen Tao as Wen Shou
Li Shu Ting as Di Chengen
Wang Yi Ting as Lin Lang
Long Shui Ting as Yuan Shu
Qin Xiao Xuan as Mu Qing
Ning Xiao Hua as Bai Zhan
Zong Feng Yan as Han Zhongyuan
Chen Jing De as Xu Hanmo
Zhang Yi Kai as Ji Li
Bai Bing Ke as Mo Shuang

Production 

In July 2021, the main leads, along with the producers and the production companies were announced. The opening ceremony was held on the same day. The series was set to film in Hengdian World Studios from July 20. On August 14, the series revealed the first poster of the main leads Dilraba Dilmurat and Gong Jun to celebrate Qixi Festival. On September 19, they officially released drama stills of the cast to celebrate Mid Autumn Festival. The series wrapped up filming on November 13, along with a set of posters from the cast.

References 

2020s Chinese television series
Chinese web series